Mervyn Alexander Dirks is a South African politician who served as a Member of the National Assembly of South Africa. A member of the African National Congress, he became an MP in 2014 and was the ANC's chief whip in the Standing Committee of Public Accounts until his suspension in January 2022. Dirks was a municipal councillor of the Msunduzi Local Municipality where he served as the deputy mayor.

Early life
Dirks grew up in the previous Transkei bantustan. He had to use a passport to cross the Umzimkulu River to attend school in the former Natal Province. He soon completed matric.

Political career
Dirks began his political activism by participating in the Happy Valley rent boycotts. He joined the United Democratic Front in the 1980s and became the organisation's head organiser in the Midlands of KwaZulu-Natal. In 1995, Dirks was elected as a municipal councillor of the Pietermaritzburg municipality. Following the 2006 municipal election, he became a member of the executive committee of the Msunduzi Local Municipality as he was elected deputy mayor. He served in the position until 2010, when the ANC recalled the municipal leadership. Dirks was elected as an MP at the 2014 general election held on 7 May. He was sworn into office on 21 May 2014. The following year, Dirks was elected to the provincial executive committee of the ANC in KwaZulu-Natal. He was re-elected for a second term as an MP in May 2019. In June 2019, he became the chief whip of the ANC in the Standing Committee on Public Accounts.

In January 2022, Dirks wrote a letter to the chairperson of the Standing Committee on Public Accounts (SCOPA), Mkhuleko Hlengwa,  in which he wanted the committee to summon ANC president and the current President of South Africa, Cyril Ramaphosa, to appear in front of the committee for his alleged misuse of state funds for party activities. Ramaphosa said in a leaked audio recording that "Investigations will reveal that a lot of public money was used (to fund political campaigns)." On 17 January, ANC chief whip Pemmy Majodina asked Dirks in a letter to withdraw his letter to Hlengwa. Dirks refused and on the same day, he wrote to the ANC's strategy group and demanded that they explain to him as to why he needs to withdraw his letter. On 20 January 2022, the ANC suspended Dirks' membership of the ANC parliamentary group pending disciplinary action against him for his "unbecoming conduct". His membership of the SCOPA has been suspended and he has been removed as the whip of the ANC's SCOPA study group. His membership of the ANC's strategy group has been suspended and he has been removed from ANC caucus WhatsApp groups. Despite Dirks' suspension, SCOPA chair Hlengwa has said that the investigation will continue.

On 30 January 2023, it was reported that Dirks and fellow ANC MP Tshilidzi Munyai had resigned from the National Assembly amid an impending Cabinet reshuffle by President Cyril Ramaphosa. Dirks said on his resignation that he would remain a party member.

Incidents
In 2017, Dirks attempted to disrupt a parliamentary debate regarding state capture. In August of that same year, he showed middle finger to the opposition MPs. He did it again on 30 November, after he called opposition MP Phumzile van Damme a "straatmeid" (prostitute). On that same day, he also threatened fellow ANC MP Tozama Mantashe, the younger sister of senior party politician Gwede Mantashe. ANC chief whip Jackson Mthembu condemned his actions.

In September 2017, The Witness reported that Dirks had an outstanding municipal debt over R60,000. Later, in 2019, Dirks was referred to the parliamentary Ethics Committee after he called certain MPs "dogs".

References

External links
Mr Mervyn Alexander Dirks – Parliament of South Africa
Mervyn Alexander Dirks – People's Assembly

Living people
Year of birth missing (living people)
People from the Eastern Cape
People from KwaZulu-Natal
Members of the National Assembly of South Africa
People from Msunduzi Local Municipality
African National Congress politicians